Ceremony for the 5th Hundred Flowers Awards was held in 1982, Beijing.

Awards

Best Film

Best Actor

Best Actress

External links
China.com.cn
Winners List

1982